The year 2020 is the 4th year in the history of the World Lethwei Championship, a Lethwei promotion based in Myanmar.

List of events

WLC 11: Battlebones 

WLC 11: Battlebones was a Lethwei event held by World Lethwei Championship on January 31, 2020 at the Thein Pyu Stadium in Yangon, Myanmar.

Background
This event featured a world title fight for the World Lethwei Middleweight Championship between the champion Too Too and the challenger Naimjon Tuhtaboyev of Uzbekistan. The event was streamed live on UFC Fight Pass.

Results

WLC 12: Hideout Battle

WLC 12: Hideout Battle was a Lethwei event held by World Lethwei Championship on  August 28, 2020 in an undisclosed location.

Background
This event was the first for the organization following the COVID-19 pandemic. France's Souris Manfredi took on Spain's Maisha Katz, with the winner making history as the Women's Bantamweight World Lethwei Champion, the first female lethwei world champion in World Lethwei Championship.

Results

WLC 14: Lethwei Showcase 

WLC 14: Lethwei Showcase was a Lethwei event held by World Lethwei Championship on  September 25, 2020 in an undisclosed location. In the main event, Light Welterweight World Lethwei Champion Antonio Faria defended his title against Spanish challenger Francisco Jose Vinuelas. Faria retained his title via TKO at the hand of the third round when Vinuelas was unable to continue.

Background

Results

References

World Lethwei Championship events
2020 in Lethwei
2020 in kickboxing
2020 in Burmese sport